Death Becomes Her is a 1992 American satirical black comedy fantasy film directed and produced by Robert Zemeckis. Written by David Koepp and Martin Donovan, it stars Meryl Streep and Goldie Hawn as rivals who fight for the affections of the same man (Bruce Willis) and drink a magic potion that promises eternal youth, but causes unpleasant side effects.

Filming began in December 1991 and concluded in April 1992, and was shot entirely in Los Angeles. Released on July 31, 1992, to mixed reviews from critics, Death Becomes Her was a commercial success, grossing $149 million worldwide on $55 million budget. The film was a pioneer in the use of computer-generated effects; it went on to win the Academy Award for Best Visual Effects.

Plot

In 1978, narcissistic actress Madeline Ashton performs in the poorly received Broadway musical Songbird!. She invites long-time frenemy Helen Sharp, an aspiring writer, backstage along with Helen's fiancé, plastic surgeon Ernest Menville. Smitten with Madeline, Ernest breaks off his engagement with Helen to marry Madeline instead. Seven years later, Helen is obese, depressed and committed to a psychiatric hospital where she plots revenge on Madeline. Another seven years later, Madeline and Ernest live in Beverly Hills, but they are miserable: Madeline's acting career has declined and Ernest, now an alcoholic, has been reduced to working as a reconstructive mortician. Receiving an invitation to a party celebrating Helen's new book, Madeline rushes to a spa where she regularly receives facial treatments. Understanding Madeline's desperation, the spa owner gives her the business card of Lisle Von Rhuman, a mysterious, wealthy socialite who specializes in rejuvenation.

Madeline and Ernest attend the party for Helen's novel, Forever Young, and discover that Helen is slim, glamorous and youthful. Dumbfounded and depressed by Helen's appearance, Madeline witnesses Helen tell Ernest that she blames Madeline for his career decline. After the soiree, Madeline visits her young lover, but discovers he is with a woman his age. Dejected, Madeline drives to Lisle's home. Lisle, claiming to be 71, but looking decades younger, reveals a potion that promises eternal life and an everlasting youthful appearance. Madeline purchases and drinks the potion and is rejuvenated, regaining her beauty. As a condition of purchase, Lisle warns Madeline to disappear from the public eye after ten years to conceal the potion's existence, and to treat her body well.

Helen seduces Ernest and convinces him to kill Madeline. When Madeline returns home, she and Ernest argue, during which she falls down the stairs, breaking her neck. Believing Madeline dead, Ernest phones Helen for advice, but drops the phone in shock when he sees Madeline approach him with her head twisted backward. At Madeline's request, Ernest drives her to the emergency room. There, Madeline is told by a doctor she is technically dead, and faints. She is taken to the morgue due to her body having no pulse and a temperature below . After rescuing Madeline, Ernest considers her reanimation a miracle and uses his skills as a mortician to repair her body at home. Helen demands information about Madeline's situation. Overhearing Helen and Ernest discussing their plot to kill her, Madeline shoots Helen with a shotgun. The blast leaves Helen with a hole in her torso but otherwise unharmed, revealing that she has also taken Lisle's potion. The two briefly fight before apologizing and reconciling their friendship. Fed up with the pair, Ernest prepares to leave, but Helen and Madeline convince him to repair their bodies one last time. Realizing they will need regular maintenance, they scheme to have Ernest drink the potion to ensure his permanent availability.

The pair knock out Ernest and bring him to Lisle, who offers to give him the potion free of charge in exchange for his surgical skills. Ernest is very tempted, but after some thought he fundamentally disagrees with the idea of immortality, especially considering the consequences Madeline and Helen are already suffering. He pockets the potion and flees, but becomes trapped on the roof. Helen and Madeline implore Ernest to drink the potion to survive an impending fall. Ernest, realizing that they only need him for their own selfish reasons, refuses and drops it to the ground, but after falling he lands in Lisle's pool and escapes. Lisle banishes Madeline and Helen from her group, leaving the pair to rely on each other for companionship and maintenance.

Thirty-seven years later, Madeline and Helen attend Ernest's funeral, where he is eulogized as having lived an adventurous and fulfilling life with a large family and friends. Now appearing grotesque, with cracked, peeling paint and putty covering most of their grey and rotting flesh, they mock the eulogy and leave early; outside the church, Helen slips on a dropped can of spray paint and falls down a flight of steps, dragging Madeline with her. Their bodies shatter to pieces at the curb, and Helen sardonically asks Madeline if she remembers where she parked their car.

Cast

Production

Casting 
Before Bruce Willis was cast, Kevin Kline was the first choice to play Dr. Ernest Menville; however, he fell out of the project due to a pay dispute with the studio. Jeff Bridges and Nick Nolte were both considered before Willis was eventually cast.

Visual effects
Death Becomes Her was a technologically complex film to make, and represented a major advancement in the use of computer-generated effects, under the pioneering direction of Industrial Light and Magic. It was the first film where computer-generated skin texture was used, in the shot where Madeline resets her neck after her head is smashed with a shovel by Helen. Creating the sequences where Madeline's head is dislocated and facing the wrong way around involved a combination of blue screen technology, an animatronic model created by Amalgamated Dynamics, and prosthetic make-up effects on Meryl Streep to create the look of a twisted neck.

The digital advancements pioneered on Death Becomes Her would be incorporated into Industrial Light and Magic's next project, Jurassic Park, released by Universal only a year later. The two films also shared cinematographer Dean Cundey and production designer Rick Carter.

The production had a fair number of mishaps. In the scene where Helen and Madeline are battling with shovels, Streep accidentally cut Goldie Hawn's face, leaving a faint scar. Streep admitted that she disliked working on a project that focused so heavily on special effects and vowed never to work on another film with heavy special effects again, saying:

Filming
Principal photography for Death Becomes Her began on 9 December 1991 and wrapped up on 7 April 1992. The film was shot entirely in Los Angeles and featured several locations frequently used in film and television, including the Greystone Mansion (Ernest's funeral home) and the Ebell of Los Angeles (Helen's book party). The exterior of Madeline and Ernest's mansion is located at 1125 Oak Grove Avenue in San Marino, but the interior was a set built on a soundstage. The ending scene where Helen and Madeline tumble down a set of stairs outside a chapel was filmed at Mount St. Mary's University in Brentwood.

Editing
The theatrical version of Death Becomes Her omitted or shortened many scenes featured in the film's rough cut. Director Robert Zemeckis decided this was needed to accelerate the pacing of the film and eliminate extraneous jokes. Most dramatically, the original ending was entirely redone after test audiences reacted negatively to it. That ending featured Ernest, after he has fled Lisle's party, meeting a bartender (Tracey Ullman) who helps him fake his death to evade Madeline and Helen. The two women encounter Ernest and the bartender 27 years later, living happily as a retired couple while Madeline and Helen give no sign that they are enjoying their eternal existence. Zemeckis thought the ending was too happy and opted for the darker ending featured in the final cut. Ullman was one of five actors with speaking roles in the film to be eliminated. Other scenes that were eliminated included one in which Madeline talks to her agent (Jonathan Silverman) and one in which Ernest removes a frozen Madeline from the kitchen freezer he has stored her in. None of the scenes have been released publicly, but sequences can still be viewed in the original theatrical trailer.

Release

Death Becomes Her opened at number one at the box office with $12,110,355 on the same weekend as Buffy the Vampire Slayer and Bebe's Kids. It went on to earn over $58.4 million domestically and $90.6 million internationally.

The film's release on DVD was called "appallingly bad", due to the quality of its transfer, which has been said to suffer from excessive grain, blur, and muted colors. A BBC review described it as "horrible" and "sloppy". Many online DVD forum users speculated that the DVD transfer was taken from the Laserdisc edition of the film and called for a restorative release. Death Becomes Her was initially distributed in an Open matte Full Screen (1.33:1) edition in the U.S. while a Widescreen version with its theatrical aspect ratio (1.85:1) was released worldwide. The latter version has also been mistakenly labelled anamorphic. It was later released in North America on Blu-ray from Shout! Factory in 2016.

Reception
Death Becomes Her received mixed reviews from critics. Rotten Tomatoes gives the film a rating of 55% based on reviews from 55 critics with the consensus: "Hawn and Streep are as fabulous as Death Becomes Hers innovative special effects; Zemeckis' satire, on the other hand, is as hollow as the world it mocks." On Metacritic, the film has a weighted average score of 56 based on 24 critics, indicating "mixed or average reviews". Audiences polled by CinemaScore gave the film an average grade of "B" on an A+ to F scale.

Gene Siskel and Roger Ebert both gave Death Becomes Her a 'thumbs down', commenting that while the film had great special effects, it lacked any real substance or character depth.

Accolades

Legacy
Death Becomes Her has acquired a significant cult following, especially in the LGBT community. An article in Vanity Fair titled "The Gloriously Queer Afterlife of 'Death Becomes Her'" called the film a "gay cult classic" and "a touchstone of the queer community". The movie is screened in bars during Pride Month, while the characters of Madeline and Helen are favorites of drag performers. In this vein, the movie inspired a Death Becomes Her-themed runway show on season 7 of RuPaul's Drag Race. The winner of season 5, Jinkx Monsoon, has cited the movie as an inspiration to become a drag queen. Jinkx has participated in Death Becomes Her-themed photoshoots, and in 2018 they played Madeline in a drag stage show parody called "Drag Becomes Her" alongside season 6 contestant BenDeLaCreme.

Tom Campbell, an executive producer of RuPaul's Drag Race, reflected on the appeal of the movie to gay audiences:

Musical
In December 2017, Kristin Chenoweth was announced to be starring in a Broadway musical adaptation of Death Becomes Her.

References

External links

 
 
 

1990s black comedy films
1992 comedy films
American black comedy films
American fantasy films
American films about revenge
American zombie comedy films
American satirical films
BAFTA winners (films)
Cultural depictions of Andy Warhol
Cultural depictions of Elvis Presley
Cultural depictions of Marilyn Monroe
1990s English-language films
Films about death
Films about immortality
Films about narcissism
Films about potions
Films about secret societies
Films directed by Robert Zemeckis
Films scored by Alan Silvestri
Films set in 1978
Films set in 1985
Films set in 1992
Films set in 2029
Films set in country houses
Films set in Los Angeles
Films shot in Los Angeles
Films that won the Best Visual Effects Academy Award
Films with screenplays by David Koepp
Universal Pictures films
1990s American films